Controversy surrounds the concept of rapid-onset gender dysphoria (ROGD), proposed as a  subtype of gender dysphoria and said to be caused by peer influence and social contagion. ROGD has not been recognized by any major professional association as a valid mental health diagnosis, and use of the term has been discouraged by the American Psychological Association, the American Psychiatric Association, the World Professional Association for Transgender Health, and other medical organizations due to a lack of reputable scientific evidence, major methodological issues in existing research, and likelihood to cause harm by stigmatizing gender-affirming care.

Lisa Littman, at the time an adjunct assistant professor at the Icahn School of Medicine at Mount Sinai, coined the term rapid-onset gender dysphoria in a 2018 study based on an online survey of parents on three anti-trans websites who believed that their teenage children had suddenly manifested symptoms of gender dysphoria and begun identifying as transgender simultaneously with other children in their peer group. Littman speculated that rapid onset of gender dysphoria could be a "social coping mechanism" for other disorders.

In August 2018, Littman (then an assistant professor of the practice at the Brown University School of Public Health) published a descriptive study in PLOS One. Criticism of the study's methodology and conclusions was voiced by some clinicians, researchers, and transgender activists, and two weeks after publication, PLOS One responded by announcing a post-publication review of the paper. On the same day as PLOS One announced its post-publication review, Brown University retracted its press release promoting the study. Controversy surrounding the paper grew as articles and opinion pieces, both critical and supportive, were published in mainstream media discussing concerns about the study's methodology and the validity of its hypotheses, as well as issues of academic freedom. Conservative media outlets heavily publicized the article and criticized Brown recalling its initial press release concerning the paper. In March 2019, the journal concluded its review and republished Littman's revised and corrected version. In 2022, Littman stood by the core claims she made in her study, adding that ROGD "does not apply to all cases of gender dysphoria" and "doesn't imply that nobody benefits from transition".

ROGD has been criticized as "anti-trans propaganda and bad science". Medical and other journals have published results of individual research studies that did not support claims that ROGD is identifiable as a distinct phenomenon, or that the onset of transgender identity among young people is influenced by social contacts online or in their real lives. Other critiques called it "methodologically flawed", said that it represented a "moral panic", or questioned whether self-reported transgender identity was, in fact, increasing. In 2021, the American Psychological Association and the American Psychiatric Association cosigned a statement with 120 other medical organizations in the evidence-based Coalition for the Advancement & Application of Psychological Science, calling for ROGD and other "anti-trans theories" not to be used in diagnostic or clinical settings, due to their lack of reputable scientific evidence. The statement also criticized the proliferation of misinformation supporting the concept of ROGD targeted at parents and clinicians and the concept's use to justify laws limiting the rights of transgender youth in the United States.

Original publication 
Lisa Littman, an American physician and researcher, coined the term "rapid-onset gender dysphoria" at the outset of her research for a descriptive study originally titled "Rapid-onset gender dysphoria in adolescents and young adults: A study of parental reports". Littman's medical specialties are in preventive medicine and public health, as well as obstetrics and gynecology. Her research interests relate to reproductive health, gender dysphoria, detransition, and maternal and child health including prematurity and the use of substances in pregnancy. Littman joined the faculty of the Brown University School of Public Health in 2018 as assistant professor of the Practice in Behavioral and Social Sciences.

Littman, then an adjunct assistant professor at the Icahn School of Medicine at Mount Sinai, became interested in the possible role of social contagion in gender dysphoria among young people after noticing that, in her small town in Rhode Island, a few teenagers in the same friend group began identifying as transgender. She conducted a study by collecting 256 responses from an online survey, which was not randomly distributed, but rather targeted at parents recruited from three anti-transgender websites where she had seen parents describe what they believed were sudden gender transitions in their adolescents: 4thWaveNow, Transgender Trend, and Youth TransCritical Professionals. The transgender youth themselves had no say in the study. Littman said she encouraged wide distribution of the survey beyond these three sites, but the study states that participants were encouraged to distribute the study only to "individuals or communities that they thought might include eligible participants", which the study defined as parents who believed "their child had a sudden or rapid onset of gender dysphoria", thus using another nonprobability sampling method known as snowball sampling. Of the three websites, an article published in Science described the first two as "gathering places for parents concerned by their children's exploration of a transgender identity", with the third being closed to non-members. Bioethicist Florence Ashley described the first as "dedicated to opposing gender-affirmative care for trans youth", and the latter two as dedicated to opposing what they call "trans ideology".

More than three-quarters of the parents surveyed had rejected their child's transgender identity. Arjee Restar, a behavioral health researcher then also at the Brown School of Public Health, wrote that the three sites were frequented by parents who already specifically promoted the concept of ROGD and that the websites were "known for telling parents not to believe their child is transgender".

Littman's study described what the surveyed parents believed to be a rapid onset of gender dysphoria among their children, along with information the parents reported about their children's peer group dynamics, social media use, and prior mental health issues. Littman speculated that rapid onset of gender dysphoria could be a "social coping mechanism" for other disorders, such as depression and anxiety caused by adolescent trauma. Littman presented preliminary results at a 2017 conference, and the descriptive study was initially published in PLOS One in August 2018.

According to MIT Technology Review, "while theories and rumors about something like ROGD had quietly percolated online before the paper was published, Littman's descriptive study gave legitimacy to the concept.... The ROGD paper was not funded by anti-trans zealots. But it arrived at exactly the time people with bad intentions were looking for science to buoy their opinions."

Correction 
The paper was met with criticism from health researchers, transgender activists, and others, who stated that it had already been politicized, and that there was self-selection bias of the subjects that Littman surveyed, as she only surveyed parents and not the young people themselves nor the health professionals caring for them. Responding to negative comments, PLOS One announced two weeks after publication that it would open a post-publication review of the study's methodologies and analyses.

In March 2019, PLOS One completed its post-publication review, and Littman's corrected version of the paper was published on March 19, 2019. In the journal's blog, PLOS One editor Joerg Heber apologized "to the trans and gender variant community" for the previous review and publication, saying "the study, including its goals, methodology, and conclusions, were not adequately framed in the published version, and that these needed to be corrected." Heber noted that the hypothesized condition of ROGD had "not yet been clinically validated".

In a notice of correction prefacing her updated version of the study, Littman stated: 

PLOS Ones editor wrote that "the corrected article now provides a better context of the work, as a report of parental observations, but not a clinically validated phenomenon or a diagnostic guideline". On behalf of the journal, Heber wrote: "Correcting the scientific record in this manner and in such circumstances is a sign of responsible publishing", where further scrutiny was called for to "clarify whether the conclusions presented are indeed backed up by the analysis and data of that original study". Heber later stated, "At its core, the survey of the parents stands as it is... We let the original results stand."

Littman responded in 2022 to what she described as mistaken assumptions about the study's goals, describing it as a "very good-faith attempt" to "find out what's going on" and adding, "As a person I am liberal; I'm pro-LGBT. I saw a phenomenon with my own eyes and I investigated, found that it was different than what was in the scientific literature." Littman has also stated that her paper "does not apply to all cases of gender dysphoria" and "doesn't imply that nobody benefits from transition". Littman stood by the core claims she made in her study, including its conclusion that more research needs to be conducted.

Terminology 
The term "rapid-onset gender dysphoria", coined by Littman, first appeared in a July 2016 notice that was posted on four websites, recruiting parents to respond to a research survey that Littman described as "Rapid onset gender dysphoria, social media, and peer groups". In the title of Littman's poster abstract for the study, published in February 2017, the phrase appeared as "Rapid Onset of Gender Dysphoria".

In 2019, Littman noted that "Rapid-onset gender dysphoria (ROGD) is not a formal mental health diagnosis at this time." She wrote: 

In a formal comment published by PLOS One at the conclusion of its review, academic editor and Professor of Social Psychology Angelo Brandelli Costa wrote, "the level of evidence produced by the Dr. Littman's study cannot generate a new diagnostic criterion relative to the time of presentation of the demands of medical and social gender affirmation." Costa suggested, "Several procedures still need to be adopted to generate a potential new subcategory of gender dysphoria that has not yet been clinically validated. One of these procedures is the assessment of mental health professionals trained according to the World Professional Association for Transgender Health (WPATH) and the American Psychological Association (APA) guidelines, interviewing not just the family, but the youth (longitudinally)."

Reactions

Institutional 
On the same day that PLOS One announced its review, Brown University took down a press release it had earlier posted about the paper. Responding to critics, Brown University president Christina Paxson and Provost Richard M. Locke said they had not infringed on academic freedom and stated that Brown's commitment to only "publicize research that unassailably meets the highest standards of excellence" required Brown to retract the press release after PLOS One opened an investigation on the paper in question. They said that "given the concerns raised about research design and methods, the most responsible course of action was to stop publicizing the work published in this particular instance. We would have done this regardless of the topic of the article."

Academic 
Several critiques of the study have been published in peer-reviewed journals. In a 2020 paper published in The Sociological Review, bioethicist Florence Ashley described the study as an attempt to circumvent existing research supporting gender-affirming care. Sociologists Natacha Kennedy and Victoria Pitts-Taylor, in two separate 2020 publications in the Journal of LGBT Youth and Sexualities, described ROGD as a moral panic and argued that trans youth are often aware of their identity long before coming out to their parents.

Shortly after PLOS One published the corrected study, a critique of the original study's methodology appeared in Archives of Sexual Behavior. The author, Arjee Restar, argued that Littman's study was fatally methodologically flawed, beginning with the choice to sample exclusively from users of three websites "known for telling parents not to believe their child is transgender", with the result that three-quarters of those surveyed had rejected their child's gender identity; 91 percent of respondents were white, 82 percent were women, and 66 percent were between the ages of 46 and 60. She wrote that the study was mostly composed of "white mothers who have strong oppositional beliefs about their children’s trans identification" and that there was very little evidence that Littman's survey responses were representative of trans youth and young adults as a whole.

In a letter to the editor, Littman responded that her methodologies were consistent with those that had been used, without controversy, in widely cited studies supporting gender identity affirmation health care.

In 2022, the eighth edition of WPATH's Standards of Care (SOC-8)—a publication providing clinical guidance for healthcare professionals working with transgender and gender diverse individuals—criticized the study due to its methodological flaws. The study's focus on parents of transgender youth recruited from communities with skepticism towards gender affirming care presents difficulty in establishing social influence as a possible factor in development of gender dysphoria. According to the SOC-8, the study's results also have not been replicated by other researchers.

The SAGE Encyclopedia of Trans Studies describes ROGD as "an anti-trans theory" that "violates principles of research methods by using a pathologizing framework and language", using terminology that compares gender dysphoria and transgender identification to a contagious disease, in opposition to organizations such as WPATH, the American Psychiatric Association, and the World Health Organization who state that being trans is not a mental disorder. The encyclopedia further states that bias appears to be present at every stage of the study, including its basic premise, the absence of random sampling, self-selection bias in the recruitment process, and the data collection procedure, which was described as "fundamentally flawed in a number of critical ways". Additionally, the encyclopedia entry notes that, although the parents may have believed the development of their child's gender identity to have been abrupt, the data were not collected from the youths themselves, and so Littman's study cannot ascertain whether these individuals had simply chosen not to reveal their gender identity at an earlier time.

Anti-LGBTQ groups 
The Southern Poverty Law Center stated "The rise of anti-trans sentiment among anti-LGBTQ groups has fueled a cottage industry of anti-trans research that in turn is promoted by anti-LGBTQ groups, including ACPeds, which has become a go-to for expertise in anti-trans pseudoscience", listing the original study as an example, further stating "anti-LGBTQ media circulated the study widely, and ACPeds' Cretella touted the study at the 2018 Values Voter gathering (sponsored by anti-LGBTQ hate group Family Research Council)."

The Human Rights Campaign stated "anti-LGBTQ+ activists often use concerns about internet safety in order to spread harmful rumors about the LGBTQ+ community. You may see opponents of trans people specifically use junk science by Lisa Littman at Brown University to falsely claim that access to social media and the internet has created a 'contagion' that causes many youth to mistakenly identify as transgender."

Popular press 
Scholars writing in The Conversation and journalists in Slate columns have condemned what they saw as politicization of science by social conservatives. Madeleine Kearns, a contributing writer at National Review, called for further study into the proposed phenomenon. Writer and transgender advocate Liz Duck-Chong described the hypothesized condition as "a poisonous lie used to discredit trans people" in an op-ed published in The Guardian, while Abigail Shrier, who later published the controversial book Irreversible Damage about the concept, called it an explanation for the experiences of parents in an op-ed published in The Wall Street Journal.

In a Psychology Today opinion piece, Rutgers University psychology professor Lee Jussim described the PLOS-requested rewrite of the paper as an "Orwellian correction" involving additions and minor changes where no errors had existed. Jeffrey Flier, a former dean of Harvard Medical School, called Brown University's failure to defend Littman "an indictment of the integrity of their academic and administrative leadership", and described Brown's explanation of the retraction as "anti-intellectual" and "completely antithetical to academic freedom".

Conservative media outlets such as Fox News, The Daily Caller, The Federalist, Breitbart, and Quillette heavily publicized the article and criticized Brown recalling its initial press release concerning the paper. Conservative outlets cite the paper to claim that transgender identity is a "trend, phase, or disease".

Professional commentary 
Following publication of the original report in PLOS One, the World Professional Association for Transgender Health (WPATH) released a position paper on the proposed term "rapid-onset gender dysphoria" and the research, stating that the term is not recognized by any professional association, nor listed in the DSM or ICD lists of disorders and diseases. They said in summary that "it is nothing more than an acronym created to describe a proposed clinical phenomenon that may or may not warrant further peer-reviewed scientific investigation." They affirmed the need for academic freedom and scientific exploration without censorship, and that much is still unknown about the factors contributing to the development of gender identity in young people, and said it was "premature and inappropriate" to use "official-sounding labels" that might influence professionals or the public to reach conclusions about how or when adolescents decide to come out as transgender. WPATH concluded by warning against the use of any term intended to cause fear about an adolescent's possible transgender status with the goal of avoiding or deterring them from accessing the appropriate treatment, in line with the standards of care appropriate for the situation.

In 2017, Ray Blanchard and J. Michael Bailey wrote for the website 4thWaveNow to promote the concept of "rapid-onset gender dysphoria". 4thWaveNow has described itself as a "community of parents and others concerned about the medicalization of gender atypical youth." The Southern Poverty Law Center has described 4thWaveNow as an anti-trans website. Julia Serano has described 4thWaveNow as a "gender critical" website.

The Gender Dysphoria Affirmative Working Group (GDA) of 44 professionals in transgender health wrote an open letter to Psychology Today citing previously published criticism of the study, stating it had multiple biases and flaws in methodology, as it drew its subjects from "websites openly hostile to transgender youth" and based its conclusions on the beliefs of parents who presupposed the existence of ROGD. Noting Littman had not interviewed the teens, the GDA stated onset may only have been "rapid" from parents' point of view because teens often delay coming out.

In 2021, the Coalition for the Advancement and Application of Psychological Science released a statement calling for the elimination of the concept of ROGD from clinical and diagnostic use, as "there are no sound empirical studies of ROGD and it has not been subjected to rigorous peer-review processes that are standard for clinical science." The statement also states that the term "ROGD" is likely to stigmatize and cause harm to transgender people, and that misinformation surrounding ROGD is used to justify laws suppressing the rights of transgender youth. The statement was cosigned by the American Psychiatric Association, the American Psychological Association, the Society of Behavioral Medicine, the Association for Behavioral and Cognitive Therapies, and the National Association of School Psychologists.

Further research 
Some clinicians state that an increasing prevalence of trans youth first presenting in early adolescence, as described in Littman's research, is consistent with their patient population, though they are uncertain as to causes or implications for clinical treatment. In a 2020 commentary in Pediatrics, citing Littman's paper among others, Annelou de Vries wrote that gender identity development was diverse and called for more research into this demographic cohort.

A November 2021 study published in the Journal of Pediatrics examined data on a cohort of 173 trans adolescents from Canada to assess whether there was evidence for a rapid-onset pathway for gender dysphoria. The authors noted that while it was common to see adolescents presenting with gender dysphoria around puberty, in many cases patients had been aware of gender dysphoria from a younger age. The authors sought to establish whether there was any link between later awareness of gender ("rapid onset") and other factors including mental health problems, lack of parental support, and high level of support from online and/or transgender friends. No evidence was found for any link between "rapid onset" and mental health problems, lack of parental support, or high level of support from online or transgender friends. Where relationships were found, they were in the opposite direction to that suggested by Littman's work—for instance, trans adolescents who had been dissatisfied with their gender for longer were more likely to suffer anxiety and more likely to misuse marijuana. The authors considered that they found no evidence of "rapid onset gender dysphoria" being a distinct clinical phenomenon.

An August 2022 study published in Pediatrics investigated claims of trans identities as "social contagion" for youth assigned female at birth (AFAB) by analyzing the ratio of assigned male at birth (AMAB) youth to AFAB trans youth in the US in 2017 and 2019. The study found that AMAB trans youth were more common than AFAB youth in both years, that the number of total trans youth declined between 2017 and 2019, and that there was a relative increase in AFAB youth over time—but this was due more to a decrease in AMAB youth than an increase in AFAB youth. This lack of increase in AFAB youth was interpreted as inconsistent with the social contagion hypothesis.

References

Further reading

LGBT-related controversies in the United States
Medical controversies in the United States
Transgender studies
LGBT youth